Johann-Peter Hinz (18 March 1941 – 11 February 2007) was a German artist and sculptor and local politician in Saxony-Anhalt.

Life 
Hinz was born in 1941 in Kolberg, where his father Paulus Hinz was pastor at the Cathedral. Several artists descended from the Hinz family, the elder brother being the sculptor  (1933-1950), the younger brother is the metal sculptor , his nephews are the sculptors ,  and Daniel Priese.

In 1946, his father got a job at the Halberstadt Cathedral, which is why the family moved there. There he first attended the Martineum (cathedral and council grammar school) and studied metal design from 1965-1970 (among others with Irmtraud Ohme) at the Burg Giebichenstein University of Art and Design. Hinz regularly attended the Halle Protestant Student Congregation during his studies under his brother's successor, student pastor Rudolf Schulze (tenure 1964-1970).

Hinz remained connected to Halberstadt throughout his life. In the 2002 television film Von Quedlinburg nach Halberstadt, the Mitteldeutscher Rundfunk showed him at work in his home town and gave him a chance to talk about his professional and voluntary work, and this film was broadcast several times.

As a convinced Christian, a metal designer and committed politician, Hinz campaigned for the preservation of Halberstadt's old town. In 1989, he was a co-initiator of the peaceful revolution in the city. After 1989, he became president of the city parliament. In 1992, he was honoured with the Federal Cross of Merit on ribbon for his commitment and his outstanding role as an initiator in the reconstruction of the city centre. In 2001 he became honorary citizen Halberstadt.

Hinz died in Halberstadt at the age of 65.

Work 
 Crucifix in the Marktkirche Unser Lieben Frauen Halle (1976)
 Müntzer-Denkmal im Hof der  (1976), together with the painter and sculptor Hans-Hermann Richter

References

External links 
 
 Life's work on the occasion of the award of honorary citizenship on 16 June 2001
 Nachruf der Stadt Halberstadt
 Audiokommentar zum Gründungsaufruf des Neuen Forums von Johann-Peter Hinz (RAM; 0 kB)

 

20th-century German sculptors
20th-century German male artists
Recipients of the Cross of the Order of Merit of the Federal Republic of Germany
1941 births
2007 deaths
People from Kołobrzeg